Beanblossom or Bean Blossom may refer to:

Beanblossom, Indiana, an unincorporated community
Beanblossom Creek, a stream in Indiana
Bean Blossom Airport, an airport in Michigan
Bean Blossom Township, Monroe County, Indiana